Claude Gagnon (born 1949 in Saint-Hyacinthe, Quebec) is a Canadian film director, screenwriter, and producer, who frequently works in both Canada and Japan. His most noted films include Keiko (1979), Kenny (1988), The Pianist (1991), Kamataki (2005), Karakara (2012) and Old Buddies (Les Vieux chums) (2020).

He won the Directors Guild of Japan New Directors Award in 1979 for Keiko.

References

External links

1949 births
Living people
People from Saint-Hyacinthe
Film directors from Quebec
Canadian male film actors
Male actors from Quebec
French Quebecers
Film producers from Quebec